The Accidental Detective 2: In Action is a 2018 South Korean crime comedy film and sequel to Kim Jung-hoon's 2015 film The Accidental Detective. The film is directed by Lee Eon-hee, starring Kwon Sang-woo, Sung Dong-il and Lee Kwang-soo. The film was released on June 13, 2018.

Plot
A comic book storekeeper, Dae-man, and the legendary homicide detective, Tae-soo, who met on previous case quit their jobs to open a private detective agency. Despite their high hopes, they soon find themselves with only trivial cases such as spouse infidelity, unpaid debt, and missing cats. Then one day, a woman walks into the office, wanting to find the truth behind the death of her fiancé. Not only that, she also offers them a handsome reward of 50,000 dollars. Dae-man and Tae-soo see it as an opportunity to put their true detective skills to work. They bring on board a third member, Yeo Chi, a Mensa genius and a small-time online private eye, and together they launch a full-fledged investigation on the case. As they dig into what initially appeared to be a straightforward case, disturbing new evidences turn up.

Cast

Main
Kwon Sang-woo as Kang Dae-man 
Sung Dong-il as Noh Tae-soo
Lee Kwang-soo as Yeo Chi

Supporting
Seo Young-hee as Lee Mi-ok
Lee Il-hwa as Noh Tae-soo's wife
Choi Deok-moon as Kim Jung-hwan
Nam Myung-ryul as Woo Won-il
Son Dam-bi as Yoon Sa-hee 
Jung Yeon-joo as Seo Hee-yeon	
Oh Hee-joon as Kim Jae-min
Choi Sung-won as Jo Young-chul
Kim Sung-kyu as Lee Dae-hyun
Park Sung-yeon as Nurse

Production
Principal photography began on June 8, 2017, and concluded on September 11, 2017.

References

External links

2018 films
South Korean sequel films
CJ Entertainment films
2010s crime comedy films
South Korean crime comedy films
South Korean buddy comedy films
South Korean detective films
2018 comedy films
2018 crime films
2010s buddy comedy films
2010s South Korean films